Valdelateja is a hamlet and minor local entity located in the municipality of Valle de Sedano, in Burgos province, Castile and León, Spain. As of 2020, it has a population of 17.

Geography 
Valdelateja is located 58km north of Burgos.

References

Populated places in the Province of Burgos